Indrajit Tharu is a Nepalese politician, belonging to the Communist Party of Nepal (Maoist). In January 2007 he was nominated to the interim legislature of Nepal on behalf of the CPN(Maoist). In April 2008, he won the Dang-1 seat in the Constituent Assembly election, defeating veteran Nepali Congress politician Khum Bahadur Khadka. Tharu got 18,903 votes.

References

Living people
Communist Party of Nepal (Maoist Centre) politicians
Nepalese atheists
Year of birth missing (living people)
Nepal Communist Party (NCP) politicians
Members of the Provincial Assembly of Lumbini Province
Members of the 1st Nepalese Constituent Assembly